

Production history 

In 1999, the Red Elvises released a new version of I Wanna See You Bellydance, with the vocals entirely sung in Russian.

Track listing 
Cosmonaut Petrov
Intro
Bellydance
Love is not for sale
El Nino
We're Dancing Lambada
Hawaiian Dancing Song
Odessa Tango
Candle
Brave Pilots' Song
Good Bye, My Love, Good Bye
New Years Song
After the Carnival

Credits 

Zhenya - guitars, vocals
Avi - drums, vocals
Igor - vocals, guitar
Oleg - bass, vocals

Guest performers:
Dimitri Mamokhin - trumpet
Gary Herbig - Sax and flute
Leo "Groovitz" Chelyapov - clarinet
Skip Waring - trombone
Chris Golden - fretless bass

Recorded at USMP Studios, Hollywood CA under the watchful ear of Svet Lazarov
Art and design by Human Fly Graphics / Go Man Go Design
With special guest Pain-in-the-ass "Art Director" Oleg Bernov

External links 
 Official site

Red Elvises albums
1999 albums